Chen Di / Chʻen Ti (1541–1617), courtesy name: Jili, was a Chinese philologist, strategist, and traveler of the Ming dynasty. A native of Lianjiang County, Fuzhou, Fujian, China, he was versed in both pen and sword. As a strategist, he served under Qi Jiguang and others for many years before retiring to occupy himself with studies and travel. He wrote an account of an expedition to Taiwan in his 1603 Dōng Fān Jì, providing one of the first descriptions of the island and its indigenous inhabitants.

As a philologist, Chen was the first to demonstrate that Old Chinese has its own phonological system, rejecting the then prevailing practice of xiéyīn (諧音) (i.e. changing the usual reading of a character in a Shi Jing poem in order to suit the rhyme). Encouraged by his senior, Jiao Hong (焦竑) (1540–1620), he wrote Máoshī Gǔyīn Kǎo (毛詩古音考) and Qūsòng Gǔyīnyì (屈宋古音義), in which he shows the ancient pronunciations (by homophones) of 650 characters. The results are based on painstaking analysis of the rhyming schemes in Shi Jing and other ancient rhymed texts, including I Ching and the poems of Qu Yuan. In his preface to the former work, Chen writes famously: "There is the past and the present; there is the north and the south. It is only inevitable that characters evolve, and sounds change." (蓋時有古今，地有南北；字有更革，音有轉移，亦勢所必至。)

References

External links
Text of Dong Fan Ji

Linguists from China
Ming dynasty generals
1541 births
1617 deaths
Writers from Fuzhou
Scientists from Fujian
Generals from Fujian
Chinese travel writers
People from Lianjiang County